Roger Vincken was a Belgian boxer. He competed in the men's featherweight event at the 1920 Summer Olympics.

References

Year of birth missing
Year of death missing
Belgian male boxers
Olympic boxers of Belgium
Boxers at the 1920 Summer Olympics
Place of birth missing
Featherweight boxers